Fittja is a part of Botkyrka Municipality and the name of the Stockholm metro station in the area. It was settled during the 1970s and consists mostly of rental apartments. As of 2008, there were 7,458 people living in Fittja; 64.7% of them were of non-Swedish origin, of whom 25.1% were non-Swedish citizens.

Fittja Mosque is also located here.

In its 2017 report, Police in Sweden placed the Alby/Fittja district in the most severe category of urban areas with high crime rates.

Fittja metro station

Fittja metro station is a station on the red line of the Stockholm metro. The station was opened in 1972. The distance to Slussen is 17.5 km.

References

Stockholm urban area
Populated places in Botkyrka Municipality
Södermanland
Million Programme